This is a list of people who were born in, residents of, or are otherwise connected to the city of London, Ontario. A person from London is referred to as a Londoner.

A-B
 D. Craig Aitchison, Canadian Army officer, current commander of Combat Training Centre, at CFB Gagetown
 Kelley Armstrong, author of fantastic fiction
 Article One, Christian pop-rock band
 Philip Aziz, painter, sculptor, designer, heritage preservationist
 R. Scott Bakker, author of fantastic fiction
 Karen Dianne Baldwin, Miss Universe 1982
 Frederick Banting, co-discoverer of insulin, practised in London and has both a museum dedicated to him and a high school named after him
 Joan Barfoot, author of fiction
 John Davis Barnett, 19th and 20th-century railroad engineer and curator-librarian
 Joe Bartoch, Olympian swimmer 
 Helen Battle (1903–1994), marine biologist
 Sir Adam Beck, instrumental in setting up the early grid to deliver hydro-electric publicly-owned power from Niagara Falls to the rest of Ontario; former mayor of London
Marc Bell, artist
Tom Benner, artist
 Justin Bieber (born 1994), singer-songwriter and actor
 Craig Richard Billington, retired professional ice hockey player, now executive with Colorado Avalanche
 The Birthday Massacre, synth-rock band
 Trevor Blumas, actor
 Bill Brady, broadcast journalist and media executive, Member of the Order of Canada, former national director of The Canadian Heart & Stroke Foundation
 Greg Brady, one-time sports radio personality, now at ( CFIQ )
 Eve Brodlique (1867-1949), British-born Canadian/American author, journalist
Josh Brown, NHL player for the Arizona Coyotes
Jacob Bryson, NHL player for the Buffalo Sabres
 Richard Maurice Bucke, 19th-century pioneer in the modern treatment of the mentally ill

C-D
 Gregory Campbell, retired player and hockey executive with Charlotte Checkers 
 Sir John Carling provincial and federal politician
 Jeff Carter, NHL forward for the Pittsburgh Penguins
 Eleanor Catton, author, winner of 2013 Man Booker Prize
 Jack Chambers, painter, filmmaker
 Margaret Chan, president of World Health Organization
 John H. Chapman, physicist
 Al Christie and his brother Charles Christie, Canadian pioneers in early Hollywood who built their own film studio
 Warren Christie, television and film actor, known for role as Ray Cataldo on the ABC drama October Road and as Aidan "Greggy" Stiviletto on the ABC series Happy Town
 Frank Colman, pro baseball player in 1940s with Pittsburgh Pirates and New York Yankees; co-founded Eager Beaver Baseball Association in 1955
 Patrick Colovin, president, University of Notre Dame
 Ward Cornell, radio drama and sports, television sports, host of Hockey Night in Canada, teacher (Pickering College)
 Logan Couture, NHL forward and Captain for the San Jose Sharks
 Hume Cronyn, Sr., politician
 Hume Cronyn, actor
 Greg Curnoe, painter, musician, member of the Nihilist Spasm Band, and author
 Lolita Davidovich, actress
 Chris Daw, gold medalist in Turin 2006 Paralympics; wheelchair curling (skip)
 John Dearness, botanist, mycologist, and educator
 Laura Dennis, professional wrestler better known as Cherry Bomb
 Dylan DeMelo, NHL hockey player for the Winnipeg Jets
 Peter Desbarats, former Global TV anchor, author, former dean of the Graduate School of Journalism at the University of Western Ontario
 Alexander Dewdney, mathematician
 Christopher Dewdney, poet
 Selma Diamond (1920–1985), actress, TV show Night Court
 Chris Doty (1966–2006), award-winning documentary filmmaker, author and playwright
 Drew Doughty,  NHL defenseman with the Los Angeles Kings
 Annie Le Porte Diggs (1853-1916), writer, temperance worker, and Populist advocate
 Brett Dier, actor
 Michael Dowse, film director

E-J
Emanuel, rhythm and blues singer
 Marc Emery, marijuana activist and libertarian
 The Essentials, a cappella group
 Paterson Ewen,  painter
 Robert W. Fassold, 29th Canadian Surgeon General
 Murray Favro, artist and musician in the Nihilist Spasm Band
 Max Ferguson, CBC radio and TV personality, 1950s and 1960s
Jessie Fleming, Member on the Canadian Women's National Soccer Team, Olympic Gold Medalist 
 Charley Fox, credited with strafing German field marshal Erwin Rommel's car and seriously injuring him in the process
 Sam Gagner, NHL forward for the Detroit Red Wings
 The Gandharvas, alternative rock band from the 1990s
 Victor Garber, actor
 Jerry Grafstein, lawyer
 George Georgallidis, Professional Gamer
 Shuman Ghosemajumder, entrepreneur, author
 Ted Giannoulas, the Famous Chicken/San Diego Chicken mascot
 George Gibson (Mooney) (1880–1967), catcher, Pittsburgh Pirates, won the World Series in 1909; manager in MLB
 Ryan Gosling, actor
 Jeff Hackett, former NHL hockey goaltender (ret. 2004)
 Matt Hackett, nephew of Jeff, NHL goaltender in 2010s.
 Paul Haggis, Academy Award-winning Hollywood screenwriter, director
 Jeremy Hansen, astronaut
 Richard B. Harrison (1864–1935), groundbreaking Black actor
 Jamelie Hassan, artist
 Frank Hawley (b. 1954), two-time world champion drag racing driver
 Gary Harvey, director television and producer
 Robert Hall Haynes (1931–1998), scientist, first chair of the Department of Biology at York University, who coined the term ecopoeisis
 William C. Heine, author, newspaper editor
 Mark Hominick (b. 1982), mixed martial artist
 Chris Horodecki (b. 1987), mixed martial artist
 Bo Horvat, NHL player 
 Garth Hudson, keyboard player in The Band
 Kenneth Adams Hunter, 17th and 20th Canadian Surgeon General
 Tommy Hunter, country singer
 J.D. Jackson, physicist
 Doug Jarrett, former NHL defenceman (ret. 1976)
 Jenny Jones, TV talk show host

K-M
 Nazem Kadri, NHL centre with the Calgary flames
 John Kapelos, character actor, frequently featured in John Hughes' films
 Ingrid Kavelaars, actress
 Penn Kemp, writer and former poet laureate of London
 Kittie, all female heavy metal band
 Travis Konecny, NHL forward with the Philadelphia Flyers
 John Labatt, pioneer brewer
 Sarah Lafleur, actress and voice actress
 Cecil Lean, actor, lyricist, composer, singer
 Graham Lear, drummer
 Brett Lindros, former NHL hockey forward, brother of Eric Lindros (ret. 1996)
 Eric Lindros, Hockey Hall of Fame member, drafted 1st overall in the 1991 Entry Draft by Quebec, brother of Brett Lindros
 John William Little, businessman and former mayor of London
 Gene Lockhart, actor who appeared in the first Blondie and Dagwood films
 Lawrence Loh, physician and Medical Officer of Health for the Region of Peel during the COVID-19 pandemic
 Guy Lombardo, world-famous bandleader and hydroplane racer, and his brothers: 
 Carmen Lombardo, 
 Lebert Lombardo,  
 Victor Lombardo,
 Donald Luce, retired NHL center, and scout. 
 Luke Macfarlane, actor
 Maggie Mac Neil, swimmer and Olympic gold medalist
 Craig MacTavish, former NHL hockey player (ret. 1997); former Edmonton Oilers head coach and GM (2000–2015); now in Europe. 
 Sam Maggs, author and comic book and video game writer (b. 1988)
 Joseph Marks, labour activist and creator of the newspaper the Industrial Banner
 Brad Marsh, former NHL defenceman (ret. 1993)
 Amber Marshall, actress (Amy Fleming from Heartland)
 Vaughn Martin, 2009 draft pick by the NFL's San Diego Chargers
 Rachel McAdams, actress
 Emilia McCarthy, actress
 Alex MacKinnon, darts player
 Rob McConnell, Music Hall of Fame jazz musician of Boss Brass fame
 Cody McCormick, retired NHL player from the Buffalo Sabres
 Roy McDonald, poet, diarist, local street-person and personality
 David McLellan, Olympic freestyle swimmer
 Charles Meredith, President of the Montreal Stock Exchange, 1902
 John Walsingham Cooke Meredith J.P., father of the "Eight London Merediths"
 Chief Justice The Hon. Richard Martin Meredith Q.C., founder of The University of Western Ontario
 Thomas Graves Meredith Q.C., President of Canada Life Assurance Company
 Sir Vincent Meredith 1st Baronet, of Montreal, President of the Bank of Montreal
 Chief Justice Sir William Ralph Meredith Q.C., M.P., Chancellor of the University of Toronto
 Orlo Miller, author
 Evan van Moerkerke, Olympic Swimmer at the 2016 Summer Olympics 
 Scott Moir, ice dancer and three-time Olympic gold medalist with his partner Tessa Virtue
 Trevor Morris, Emmy award winning composer and music producer
 Masasa Moyo, actress and voice actress

N-P
 Kate Nelligan, actress
 Christine Nesbitt, Olympic gold and silver medal-winning speed-skater (women's 1000m, and women's team pursuit, respectively)
 Nihilist Spasm Band, pioneering noise music band
 Bert and Joe Niosi (brothers), band members of radio's Happy Gang
 O. E. L. "Bud" Graves, artist and painter/sculptor
 Ocean, Christian folk rock band
 Bryan Lee O'Malley, comic book artist and writer, award-winning cartoonist and creator of Scott Pilgrim
 Megan Park, actress
 Casey Patton, boxer
 Paul Peel, painter
 David Peterson, Premier of Ontario, 1985–1990
 Ed Pien, artist
 Chris Potter, actor
 Skip Prokop, rock drummer and songwriter, founder of the band Lighthouse
 Brandon Prust, former NHL forward.

R-S
 Jack Richardson, C.M., award-winning record producer, Lifetime Achievement Juno Award recipient, Order of Canada recipient, and educator at Fanshawe College
 Michael Riley, television actor
 John P. Robarts, premier of Ontario, 1961–1971
 Jesse Ronson, professional mixed martial artist
 Vic Roschkov Sr., newspaper editorial cartoonist/illustrator
 Jacob Ruby, football player Edmonton Eskimos
 J. Philippe Rushton, researcher and academician at University of Western Ontario
 Jude St. John, veteran, all-star player with Toronto Argonauts
 Lara St. John, violinist, sister of Scott St. John
 Scott St. John, violinist and violist, brother of Lara St. John
 Charles Edward Saunders, agricultural scientist, principal developer of Marquis wheat
 William Saunders, agricultural scientist, founder of Canada's Experimental Farm system
 Brett Seney, hockey player
 Shad, hip-hop musician
 Shaedon Sharpe, NBA player for the Portland Trail Blazers
 Nick Shaw, musician
 David Shore, writer or producer for the television program House
 Christine Simpson, Sports Broadcaster, and sibling of Craig and Dave,
 Craig Simpson, former NHL hockey player and coach, now Broadcaster.
 Dave Simpson, former player with London Knights and current professor at the Richard Ivey School of Business
 George Sipos, writer
 Meaghan Smith, singer-songwriter
 Timothy Snelgrove, founder of Timothy's World Coffee
 Ross Somerville, six-time Canadian Amateur Championship winner in golf, first Canadian to win U.S. Amateur in 1932
 Clara Sorrenti, Twitch streamer and transgender activist
 Jonny Staub, radio personality
 Barry Steers, Canadian Ambassador to Brazil (1971–1976), High Commissioner to Bermuda (1976–1979), Ambassador to Japan (1981–1989)
 Janaya Stephens, actress, star of the Left Behind movie series

 Adam Stern, Major League Baseball player with the Baltimore Orioles
 Sam Stout, Ultimate Fighting Championship competitor
 David Suzuki, geneticist, environmentalist, writer and broadcaster
 Nick Suzuki, NHL player for the Montreal Canadiens
 Ryan Suzuki, NHL prospect for the Carolina Hurricanes, with the Chicago Wolves

T-Z
 Salli Terri, mezzo-soprano
 Ryan Thelwell, former National Football League  player with San Diego Chargers and  Pittsburgh Steelers, 3 time Grey Cup Champion BC Lions and Calgary Stampeders
 Thine Eyes Bleed, metal band featuring Johnny Araya, brother of Slayer bassist, and vocalist Tom Araya
 Jim Thompson, businessman, philanthropist, and sportsman
 Scott Thornton, former NHL player (ret. 2008)
 Tim Tindale, former American football player with Buffalo Bills and Chicago Bears
 Five of the six Tolpuddle Martyrs, convicted in England for forming the first trade union there, settled in London
 Jason Tunks, Olympian, discus thrower
 Two Crown King, alternative rock and alternative hip hop band
 Mike Van Ryn, retired NHL player and Assistant Coach with St. Louis Blues.
 Jolene Van Vugt, first woman to perform a backflip on a dirt bike
 Tessa Virtue, ice dancer and three-time Olympic gold medalist with partner Scott Moir
 Brian Vollmer, lead singer of Helix
 Shannon Walsh, documentary filmmaker 
 Damian Warner, Gold Medal Olympian from the 2020 Summer Olympics in the Men's Decathlon
 Jack L. Warner, co-founder of Warner Brothers Studios
 Colton White, NHL player for the Anaheim Ducks
 Jeff Willmore, visual and performance artist
 Tomasz Winnicki, white supremacist, anti-Semite and subject of complaints before the Canadian Human Rights Tribunal
 Marion Woodman, Jungian and feminist writer
Shelina Zadorsky, member of the Canadian Women's National Soccer Team, Bronze Olympic Medalist
 Jessica Zelinka, former Olympic athlete (heptathlon).

References

 
London
London